Echinodillo cavaticus, the Flinders Island cave slater, is a species of woodlouse in the family Armadillidae. It is endemic to caves on Flinders Island, Tasmania.

References

Crustaceans of Australia
Animals described in 1963
Woodlice